STM (Savunma Teknolojileri Mühendislik ve Ticaret A.Ş.) is a company operating in Turkey, operating in the civil, public (including military) and private sectors.

History
STM was established in 1991 by decree from the Turkish Government’s Defence Industry Executive Committee to provide project management, system engineering, technology transfer, technical and logistical support, and consultancy services to the Presidency of the Republic of Turkey, Presidency of Defense Industries (SSB) and the Turkish Armed Forces (TSK).

Governance
STM is managed by a Governance Board with five members, led by Chairman Prof. Dr.  İsmail DEMİR, with General Manager Özgür GÜLERYÜZ as of June 2020 (formerly the Assistant General Manager — Engineering and Consulting.)

Operations
STM has three main divisions: engineering, technology and consultancy. It operates in the fields of military naval platforms, cybersecurity, autonomous systems, radar systems, satellite technologies, command and control systems, certification and consultancy.

Major projects
STM's major projects include:
 MILGEM project: Istanbul-class frigate, Ada-class corvette
 Reis-class submarine
 TAI/AgustaWestland T129 ATAK helicopter – mission support system
 ALTAY main battle tank – Command, Control, Communications and Information System
 Modernisation of Pakistan Navy Agosta 90B class submarines
 Production of Turkish electronic identity cards
 Engineering support for Pakistan's build of the Fleet Tanker, PNS Moawin (A39)
 Production of the STM Kargu rotary wing drone

References

External links
STM website (English version)

Turkish companies established in 1991
Defence companies of Turkey
Unmanned aerial vehicle manufacturers of Turkey